Snover may refer to:

 Charles A. Snover (1855-1916), Wisconsin politician
 Horace G. Snover (1847–1924), politician and judge from the U.S. state of Michigan
 Jeffrey Snover, lead architect of PowerShell and the Enterprise Cloud Group at Microsoft
 Snover, Michigan, community in Sanilac County named for Horace G. Snover
 Snover (Pokémon), a character that first appeared in the 4th generation of Pokémon